John Pospisil is an American sound editor. He received the Special Achievement Academy Award during the 60th Academy Awards for Best Sound Editing along with Stephen Hunter Flick for the film RoboCop.

Selected filmography
Contagion (2011)
Cloudy with a Chance of Meatballs (2009)
Max Payne (2008)
Ocean's Thirteen (2007)
Serenity (2005)
Spy Kids 3D: Game Over (2003)
Time Machine (2002)
Planet of the Apes (2001)
The Green Mile (1999)
Sleepy Hollow (1999)
Virus (1999)
Lethal Weapon 4  (1998)
Small Soldiers (1998)
The Fifth Element (1997)
From Dusk Till Dawn (1996)
Twister (1996)
Apollo 13 (1995)
The Lion King (1994)
Hard Target (1993)
Matinee (1993)
The Nightmare Before Christmas (1993)
Aladdin (1992)
Batman Returns (1992)
The Addams Family (1991)
Beauty and the Beast (1991)
Edward Scissorhands (1990)
Predator 2 (1990)
RoboCop 2 (1990)
Tremors (1990)
The 'Burbs (1989)
Star Trek V: The Final Frontier (1989)
Alien Nation (1988)
Innerspace (1987)
Predator (1987)
RoboCop (1987)
Star Trek IV: The Voyage Home (1986)
Brewster's Millions (1985)
Explorers (1985)
2010 (1984)

References

External links

American sound editors
Best Sound Editing Academy Award winners
Special Achievement Academy Award winners
Living people
Date of birth missing (living people)
Year of birth missing (living people)